The peso (established as the peso convertible) is the currency of Argentina, identified by the symbol $ preceding the amount in the same way as many countries using peso or dollar currencies. It is subdivided into 100 centavos. Its ISO 4217 code is ARS.

The Argentine currency has experienced severe inflation, with periods of hyperinflation, since the mid-20th century, with periodic change of the currency to a new version at a rate ranging from 100:1 to 10,000:1. A new peso introduced in 1992 was worth 10,000,000,000,000 (ten trillion) of the pesos in use until 1970. Since the early 21st century, the Argentine peso has experienced further substantial inflation, reaching 102.5% year-on-year in February 2023, the highest since the 1992 introduction of the current peso.

The official exchange rate for the United States dollar valued the new peso at one US dollar at its introduction in 1992; it then dropped, hovering around 3:1 from 2002 to 2008, dropping from 6:1 to 10:1 between 2009 and 2015, and continuing to drop. On 3 February 2023 the official government exchange rate  was ARS$188 to one US dollar; the unregulated rate valued the peso at about half, with ARS$375=USD$1. There are sometimes multiple official exchange rates for different purposes such as supporting exporters.

History
Amounts in earlier pesos were sometimes preceded by a "$" sign and sometimes, particularly in formal use, by symbols identifying that it was the specific currency in use at the time, for example "100" or "" for pesos moneda nacional. The peso introduced in 1992 is just called peso (until 2002, peso convertible), and is written preceded by a "$" sign only. Earlier pesos replaced currencies also called peso, and sometimes two varieties of peso coexisted, making it necessary to have a distinguishing term to use, at least in the transitional period; the 1992 peso replaced a currency with a different name, austral.

Peso before 1826
The peso was a name often used for the silver Spanish eight-real coin. Following independence, Argentina began issuing its own coins, denominated in reales, soles and escudos, including silver eight-real (or sol) coins still known as pesos. These coins, together with those from neighbouring countries, circulated until 1881.

Peso fuerte, 1826–1881
In 1826, two paper money issues began, denominated in pesos. One, the peso fuerte ($F) was a convertible currency, with 17 pesos fuertes equal to one Spanish ounce (27.0643 g) of 0.916 fine gold. It was replaced by the peso moneda nacional at par in 1881.

Peso moneda corriente, 1826–1881

The non-convertible peso moneda corriente (everyday currency) ($m/c) was also introduced in 1826. It started at par with the peso fuerte, but depreciated with time.

Although the Argentine Confederation issued 1-, 2- and 4-centavo coins in 1854, with 100 centavos equal to 1 peso = 8 reales, Argentina did not decimalize until 1881. The peso moneda nacional (m$n or $m/n) replaced the earlier currencies at the rate of 1 peso moneda nacional = 8 reales = 1 peso fuerte = 25 peso moneda corriente. Initially, one peso moneda nacional coin was made of silver and known as patacón. However, the 1890 economic crisis ensured that no further silver coins were issued.

Gold and silver pesos, 1881–1970
The Argentine gold coin from 1875 was the gold peso fuerte, one and two-thirds of a gram of gold of fineness 900, equivalent to one and a half grams of fine gold, defined by Law no. 733 of 1875. This unit was based on that recommended by the European Congress of Economists in Paris in 1867 and adopted by Japan in 1873 (the Argentine 5 peso fuerte coin was equivalent to the Japanese 5 yen).

The system before 1881 has been described as "monetary anarchism" (anarquía monetaria). Gold coins of 5 and 2.5 pesos were to be used, silver coins of one peso and 50, 20, 10 and 5 centavos, and copper coins of 2 and 1 centavos.

Peso moneda nacional, 1881–1970

The depreciated peso moneda corriente was replaced in 1881 by the paper peso moneda nacional (national currency, (m$n or $m/n)) at a rate of 25 to 1.  This currency was used from 1881 until January 1, 1970. The design was changed in 1899 and, again, in 1942.

Initially the peso m$n was convertible, with a value of one peso oro sellado. Convertibility was maintained off and on, with decreasing value in gold, until it was finally abandoned in 1929, when m$n 2.2727 was equivalent to one peso oro.

Peso ley, 1970–1983

The peso ley 18.188 (ISO 4217: ARL) (informally called the peso ley) replaced the previous currency at a rate of 1 peso ley to 100 pesos moneda nacional.

Peso argentino, 1983–1985

The peso argentino ($a) (ISO 4217: ARP) replaced the previous currency at a rate of 1 peso argentino to 10,000 pesos ley (1 million pesos m$n). The currency was born just before the return of democracy, on June 1, 1983. However, it rapidly lost its purchasing power and was devalued several times, and was replaced by a new currency called the austral in June 1985.

Austral, 1985–1991

The austral ("₳") (ISO 4217: ARA) replaced the peso argentino at a rate of 1 austral to 1,000 pesos (one billion pesos m$n). During the period of circulation of the austral, Argentina suffered from hyperinflation. The last months of President Raul Alfonsín's period in office in 1989 saw prices increase constantly (200% in July alone), reflected in a worsening exchange rate. Emergency notes of 10,000, 50,000 and 500,000 australes were issued, and provincial administrations issued their own currency for the first time in decades. The value of the currency stabilized two years after President Carlos Menem was elected.

Peso convertible, since 1992
In 1992 a new peso (ISO 4217: ARS) was introduced, referred to as peso convertible since the international exchange rate was fixed by the Central Bank at 1 peso to 1 U.S. dollar, and for every peso convertible circulating, there was a US dollar in the Central Bank's foreign currency reserves. It replaced the austral at a rate of 1 peso = 10,000 australes. After the various changes of currency and dropping of zeros, one peso convertible of 1992 was equivalent to 10 trillion pesos moneda nacional of 1970.

After the financial crisis of 2001, the fixed exchange rate system was abandoned in January 2002, and the exchange rate fluctuated, up to a peak of four pesos to one dollar (a 75% devaluation) at the time. The resulting export boom produced a massive inflow of dollars into the Argentine economy, which helped lower their price. For a time the administration stated and maintained a strategy of keeping the exchange rate at between 2.90 and 3.10 pesos per US dollar, in order to maintain the competitiveness of exports and encourage import substitution by local industries.

The effect of this may be compared to the neighboring Brazilian real, which was roughly on a par with the Argentine peso until the beginning of 2003, when both currencies were about three per U.S. dollar. The real started gaining in value more than the peso due to Brazil's slower build-up of dollar reserves; by December 29, 2009, a real was worth almost 2.2 pesos.

In December 2015, US dollar exchange restrictions were removed in Argentina following the election of President Mauricio Macri. As a result, the difference between the official rate and the unofficial "blue" rate almost disappeared for a time.

The rate gradually worsened; on 29 July 2022 one U.S. dollar was quoted at 131.22 pesos at the official rate and 298 pesos, 2.27 times higher (+127%), in unregulated markets.

Coins
In 1992, 1, 5, 10, 25 and 50 centavo coins were introduced, followed by 1 peso in 1994. Two-peso coins were introduced in 2010. One-centavo coins were last minted in 2001.

Commemorative coins
Commemorating the National Constitutional Convention, 2 and 5-peso nickel coins were issued in 1994.

2 peso coins were issued in 1999 to commemorate the centenary of the birth of writer  Jorge Luis Borges, with Borges portrayed on the obverse and a labyrinth and the Hebrew letter aleph on the reverse. On September 18, 2002, a 2-peso coin with Eva Perón's face was introduced to commemorate the 50th anniversary of her death; this coin was to replace the AR$2 banknote if inflation continued to be high. None of the 2-peso coins are widely circulated.

Some other 50-centavo and 1-peso coins commemorate different events, including the 50th anniversary of the creation of UNICEF (1996); the attainment of voting rights by women (1997); the establishment of Mercosur (1998); and the death of José de San Martín (2001).

Several 1 peso coins were issued in 2010 to commemorate the bicentennial of the May Revolution, all featuring the same obverse, different from the main series, and images of different places on the reverse, including Mar del Plata, the Perito Moreno Glacier, Mount Aconcagua, the Pucará de Tilcara, and El Palmar.

Banknotes
In 1992, banknotes were introduced in denominations of 1, 2, 5, 10, 20, 50, and 100 pesos. The 1-peso note was replaced by a coin in 1994. Until 2001 banknotes bore the legend "Convertibles de curso legal", meaning that their value was fixed to the same amount in US dollars. As most older bills have been replaced, it is rare to find ones marked as convertible except in the large $100 denominations. All bills are 155 × 65 mm in size.

Fourth Series
In 2016, the Banco Central de la República Argentina issued a new series of banknotes, with the 200 and 500 peso banknotes as the newest denominations. New 20 and 1,000 peso notes were issued in 2017, and new banknotes of 50 and 100 pesos were issued in 2018. A new series of coins in denominations of $1, $2, $5, and $10 was issued from 2018.

5,000 peso design concept
The design concept of a banknote of 5,000 pesos was shown on 16 May 2020. The note was not issued, but the design was used for the $2,000 note announced in February 2023.

Fifth Series
In May 2022, the Banco Central de la República Argentina announced a new series of 100, 200, 500, and 1000 peso notes, replacing the animal motifs of the 2016 series with pictures of Argentine historical figures and events while maintaining the color scheme, to be released within the following six months. In February 2023 a $2,000 note was announced, portraying the Instituto Malbrán and pioneering doctors Cecilia Grierson and Ramón Carrillo, with no date of issue stated. It will not have a watermark or security thread. This was the design originally intended for the $5,000 note described in May 2020, and uses the plates prepared for it.

In March 2023 the Central Bank of Argentina approved the issuance of the 2,000 pesos banknote. The creation takes place due to the high inflation of the country, which has triggered the amount of banknotes in circulation.

Exchange rates

At the end of 2011, exchange control measures were implemented, which managed to reduce capital flight by 85%. One consequence of these measures was the appearance of multiple exchange rates and a parallel market (colloquially called the blue dollar), which was accessed by individuals and companies. Special official exchange rates are sometimes created and abolished, to support sectors of the economy. There has been a "soybean dollar"; a special rate for exports from regional economies was applicable between 20 November and 30 December 2022.

On 4 November 2022 a "foreign tourist dollar" rate close to the black market rate (355 pesos to the dollar instead of the official 195 at the end of February 2023) was introduced, for purchases made with foreign payment cards. This was to encourage people to visit the country while discouraging them from using the currency black market. Tourist dollars spent in January 2023 were nearly five times as many as in January 2022.

The following table, always up-to-date, lists current official interbank rates; the parallel rate values the peso significantly lower.

Constantly updated link to URL with current parallel ("blue") exchange rate:

See also
 Casa de Moneda de la República Argentina – Argentine mint
 Economy of Argentina
 Historical exchange rates of Argentine currency

References

Further reading
 Cunietti-Ferrando, Arnaldo J.: Monedas de la Republica Argentina desde 1813 a nuestros Dias. Cooke & Compañia. Editores Numismaticos, Buenos Aires, 1978.
 Cunietti-Ferrando, Arnaldo J.: Monedas y Medallas. Cuatro siglos de historia y Arte. Coins and Medals. Four centuries of history and art. Manrique Zago ediciones, Buenos Aires, 1989.
 Janson, Hector Carlos: La Moneda Circulante En El Territorio Argentino 1767–1998. Buenos Aires, 1998.

External links
  Current legal tender banknotes and coins of the Argentine Republic (not up to date)
 Banknotes of Argentina 1992–2011
  Argentine Notes; site has Spanish and English versions, more detail in Spanish
 Argentina Banking Info
 Images of historic and modern Argentine coins
 Coins of Argentina, online catalog
  Cotización del dólar en Argentina
  Dólar Oficial, Informal, BCRA de Referencia, Banco Nación, Mayorista Bancos - Ambito.com
 Argentine Peso ARS exchange rates today
 ARS to USD exchange rates
  Seguimiento del dólar y divisas en la República Argentina
 US dollar/peso exchange rates, official and parallel

Economy of Argentina
Currencies of Argentina
1826 introductions
1826 establishments in Argentina